Walter Keith Caple Wookey (1912 - 1963), also known as Keith Wookey, was a District Officer and later Resident in the post-war British Colonial Government of North Borneo. At some point Wookey was the most senior official stationed in Sandakan as Resident (known as Resident Commissioner in full) and was also appointed by the Queen to the Executive Council, North Borneo.

Biography

Early life 

Walter Keith Caple Wookey was born in Sleaford, Lincolnshire and soon after moved to Barbados Lodge, Bath, Somerset, schooled at Lewisham, Bristol, UK and went on to further his studies at Oxford. His mother, Elizabeth Walker, died in 1921 at the birth of Keith’s sister Betty. Soon, both Keith & Betty were taken to their grandparents, Francis & Alice Wookey who raised them at Stones Cross House, Somerset. On the 28th June 1935 Keith joined the Royal Navy Volunteer Reserve becoming a probationary second Lieutenant 9 (UK Navy List 1935).

Pre-war 

On 17 April 1936 Keith came to North Borneo as a cadet (trainee government official), joining the British North Borneo Chartered Company administrators. He arrived in Sandakan with Mr J.H. Macartney by S.S. Kajang on 18 April 1936. At the beginning of his career as a trainee government official, Keith was placed within the Secretariat, although he was also supervised most of the time by the Under Secretary. From then on, Keith transferred from various branches of Government taking short posts while doing his study of the Laws of the State and of the Malay language.

In 1938, two years after his arrival in Sandakan, Keith became Assistant District officer at Mempakul (today as the westernmost part of Sabah, Malaysia; known as Kampung Mempakul) and then was posted to Kota Belud after a year. During his stay in Kota Belud, Keith met his first wife, Tampusis; they had two girls, Agnes (born 1940) and Susan (born 1941).  During this time, Keith lived in various Kampongs for weeks at a time, and claims he became proficient in various dialects of Dusun, Kadazan language. Not long after Susan’s birth in 1941, Keith’s family moved to Lahad Datu where he was appointed as an Assistant District Officer.

Life during the War 

In January 1942, while Keith was posted in Lahad Datu, the rule of the British North Borneo Chartered Company was abruptly ended and North Borneo was taken over by Japanese Imperial forces after their  landing in Jesselton (presently known as Kota Kinabalu).  Despite the impossibility of resisting the Japanese naval and military forces, the chartered company ordered its posted officials to stay in their assigned places and aid in protecting the locals by giving advice in the face of the invasion. 

Keith, during this time, was badly beaten and taken away from his family, while Tampusis was forced to remarry in order to protect herself from the Japanese Imperial Army. The Japanese shipped Keith first to Sandakan at Berhala Island with Harry Keith and other fellow officers. Later on, he was moved to Kuching, spending his next three years in Batu Lintang camp which was under the command of Lieutenant-Colonel Tatsuji Suga.

"The behaviour of the population during this period was, with very few exceptions, exemplary, and many paid for their loyalty with their lives. The British Military Administration, which contained a few former Chartered Company senior officers, found the Colony in a state of appalling devastation."

For more than three years, North Borneo remained under the control of the Japanese Imperial Army until the units of the Ninth Australian Division landed in Labuan on 10 June 1945. In Keith’s personal journal entry dated 20 August 1945, he states that this was the first time he was given a piece of paper to write on since the Japanese invasion.

Post War 

In September 1945, Keith and his friend Dr. Marcus Clarke, then a surgeon captured by the Japanese and stationed in Batu Lintang as well, were released from internment. Shortly thereafter, Keith traveled to Sydney, Australia for recuperation in 1946. Upon his return to North Borneo in 1947, Keith played a key role in the rebuilding and the development of Sandakan in the aftermath of the Second World War. During this time, the territory changed status from a protectorate of England and administration by the Chartered Company to a Crown Colony, overseen by the government of Britain in London.

During a short stay in Australia while on leave, he met Eleanor Farrell, whom he soon married. Upon his return to North Borneo with Eleanor in 1948, Keith was posted in Tenom as a District Officer. Two years later, Keith and Eleanor moved to Jesselton and in May 1950, their first son Michael was born. There, during the early 1950s that Keith became close friends with Governor Roland Turnbull. In 1956, after a five-year service, Keith was appointed as a permanent member of the Executive Legislature and was appointed in 1957 as Resident of Sandakan. At the same year, his second son Robin was born. 

Wookey was appointed by the Queen as an Official Member of the Executive Council of the Colony of North Borneo. He opposed the succession by the crown of the colony of North Borneo to join the Malaysian federation, and was accused of obstruction by Tunku Abdul Rahman, Malaysia's first Prime Minister.

In November 1963, Keith died of a heart attack shortly after North Borneo (now known as Sabah) was granted self-governance on 31 August 1963, preparing to join Malaya, Sarawak and Singapore in forming the Federation of Malaysia.

References

External links 
 http://www.northborneohistory.com

1912 births
1963 deaths
British colonial officials
British Borneo